The 1978 Massachusetts gubernatorial election was held on November 7, 1978. Former Massachusetts Port Authority executive director Edward J. King was elected to a four-year term, from January 4, 1979, until January 6, 1983. King won the Democratic nomination by defeating incumbent Governor of Massachusetts Michael Dukakis in the Democratic primary.

, this was the most recent Massachusetts gubernatorial election in which both major party candidates are now deceased.

Democratic primary

Governor

Candidates
Barbara Ackermann, former Mayor of Cambridge
Michael Dukakis, incumbent Governor
Edward J. King, former executive director of the Massachusetts Port Authority

Declined

David M. Bartley, former Speaker of the Massachusetts House of Representatives
Charles Flaherty, State Representative
Paul Guzzi, Secretary of the Commonwealth(running for U.S. Senate)
Kevin Harrington, President of the Massachusetts State Senate 
Alan Sisitsky, State Senator
Robert H. Quinn, former Massachusetts Attorney General and candidate for governor in 1974
Robert Coldwell Wood, University of Massachusetts President

On October 25, 1977, Edward J. King announced that he would seek the Democratic nomination for governor. King also considered running as an Independent or a Republican. King attacked Dukakis for not keeping his promises, specifically his pledge not to raise taxes. A fiscal and social conservative, King was anti-abortion and supported capital punishment, offshore drilling, increased nuclear power, greater research on solar energy, less business regulation, raising the drinking age to 21, and mandatory sentences for drug dealers.

On March 30, 1978, Ackerman announced her candidacy for governor. She positioned herself as the party's liberal alternative to Dukakis. She criticized the governor for failing to deliver adequate human services, not cutting the cost of government, and not attracting new jobs.

During the primary race, King was critical of Dukakis, Ackerman attacked Dukakis' record and King's positions on the issues, and Dukakis focused on his accomplishments and ignored his two opponents. Due to his incumbency, Dukakis held the early lead in the race. King was able to raise more money than his opponents due to his support from the business community. King focused his spending on extensive media advertising while Dukakis spent more money on organization than advertising. Ackerman struggled to raise money throughout the campaign and could not afford to advertise on television or in a daily newspaper.

Results

King upset Dukakis 51% to 42% with Ackerman receiving the remaining 7%.

Lieutenant Governor

Candidates
Thomas P. O'Neill III, incumbent Lieutenant Governor

Declined

Jack Backman, State Senator
John L. Buckley, Secretary of Administration and Finance
Paul Guzzi, Secretary of the Commonwealth (running for U.S. Senate)
Philip W. Johnston, State Representative
 Michael McLaughlin, Middlesex County Commissioner
 Ronald Pine, State Representative
Lois Pines, State Representative
 Rosemarie Sansone, Boston City Councilwoman
Alan Sisitsky, State Senator

Results
Incumbent Thomas O'Neill III was unopposed for renomination.

Republican primary

Governor

Candidates
Francis W. Hatch Jr., Minority Leader of the Massachusetts House of Representatives
Edward F. King, businessman and anti-tax activist

Withdrew
John Buckley, Middlesex County Sheriff

Declined
Donald R. Dwight, former Lieutenant Governor
Elliot Richardson, former Massachusetts Attorney General and member of the Ford administration

Campaign
On October 27, 1977, Massachusetts House minority leader Francis W. Hatch, Jr. became the first Republican candidate for governor. He was joined at his first campaign press conference by former ambassador Henry Cabot Lodge, Jr., former state senator Philip A. Graham, and former state party chairman William A. Barnstead. He believed that the real issues of the campaign were property tax relief, creating jobs and improving the state's economy, welfare reform, revamping auto insurance, and making government more open.

In November 1977, party chairman Gordon M. Nelson leaked a poll of Republican campaign contributors that showed Richardson was the top choice for governor with 47% followed by Edward F. King with 27%, Hatch with 18%, former governor Francis W. Sargent with 7%, and Middlesex County Sheriff John J. Buckley with 2%.

On January 4, 1978, Edward F. King announced his candidacy for governor. A businessman who founded and ran a data consulting company and a real estate company, King ran as a political outsider. He was best known for leading the successful campaign to defeat the graduated income tax proposals in 1972 and 1976. A conservative, he listed Ronald Reagan and Meldrim Thomson, Jr. as among his heroes. King pledged to cut the state budget by $600 million and eliminate some agencies and programs. He took stances against busing, abortion, gay rights, and gun control. King focused his early campaign on winning the Republican state convention, which he believed would catapult him through the primary and victory over Dukakis in the general election. He pledged to drop out of the race if he did not win the convention vote.

Because Edward F. King had the same name as Democratic candidate Edward J. King, the two candidates were often confused with each other. As the younger and less known candidate, Edward F. King believed that the name confusion worked to his advantage as it gave his name double exposure. Conversely, as the better known candidate, Edward J. King became wary of the confusion. In addition to having the same name, the two Kings also had similar political positions (they both ran as pro-business, anti-tax conservatives) and both attended Boston College (Edward J. King graduated, but Edward F. King left to go into business). Physically, the two were not alike as the Democratic King was large (six-feet tall) and quiet while the Republican was five foot-six and described as "fiery".

On February 6, 1978, John J. Buckley entered the GOP race. Buckley believed that as a fiscal conservative who was liberal on social issues, he was the best Republican candidate to beat Dukakis. He also cited the fact that he had been elected in a heavily Democratic county while King had never run for public office before and Hatch had lost his previous bids for higher office as another reason why he was the best candidate. Buckley reiterated his opposition to the death penalty and promised to veto any attempts to eliminate abortions. He also stated that he wanted to let private businesses perform many state functions, including the Medicaid program. He declined to promise that he would not raise taxes.

The Republican Convention was held on May 6, 1978, at the Symphony Hall in Springfield, Massachusetts. On the first ballot, King received a plurality of the votes with 898 to Hatch's 874 and Buckley's 212. Before the second ballot, Buckley announced that he was withdrawing his candidacy and attempted to move his delegates to Hatch. However, King won the nomination. After the defeat, Hatch announced that he would challenge King in the primary. Although Buckley withdrew at the convention he still considered running in the primary. However, on May 17 he officially exited the governor's race. He later entered the race for the United States House of Representatives seat in Massachusetts's 5th congressional district, which was being vacated by Paul Tsongas.

During the primary campaign, King attacked Hatch for being a "professional politician" and an "insurgent" candidate. He stated as House Minority Leader, Hatch shared a responsibility for higher taxes and spending. King also touted his role as a leader in the taxpayer revolt. Hatch on the other hand ignored King and focused his attack on the Democratic frontrunner and incumbent Governor Michael Dukakis.

Results
Hatch defeated King 56% to 44%.

Lieutenant Governor

Candidates
William I. Cowin, former Secretary of Administration and Finance (running with Hatch)
Peter McDowell, State Representative (running with King)

Campaign
On April 28, 1978, Edward F. King chose State Representative Peter McDowell to be his running mate. McDowell was chosen by King largely because McDowell opposed a clause in an ethics bill supported by King's primary opponent, Francis W. Hatch, Jr., that would require politicians to disclose all clients they had done more than $1000 worth of business with. He felt the provision was unfair because businesses would not want to disclose this information for competitive reasons. He also felt it was unfair to the clients to have their names disclosed because they had nothing to do with political activities. Following King's victory at the Republican convention, McDowell was acclaimed as the party's nominee.

After John J. Buckley dropped out at the convention to support Hatch, it was rumored that Hatch would select Buckley to be his running mate. However, on May 25, 1978, Hatch announced that former Secretary of Administration and Finance William I. Cowin would be his running mate.

Results
Cowin defeated McDowell in the Republican primary to become his party's nominee for lieutenant governor.

General election

Campaign
Due to the presence of a conservative Democrat and a liberal Republican in the race, there were some members of each party that endorsed the other's candidate. William A. Casey, the Republican nominee for Massachusetts State Auditor, dropped out of the race to endorse King. Unsuccessful Republican gubernatorial candidate Edward F. King, California anti-tax activist Howard Jarvis, New Hampshire Governor Meldrim Thomson, and Lloyd B. Waring, a prominent Republican fundraiser and former Chairman of the Massachusetts Republican Party, also endorsed King.

Conversely, unsuccessful Democratic gubernatorial candidate Barbara Ackermann, state representatives Barney Frank, Mel King, Saundra Graham, Doris Bunte, Robert Fortes, and James Segel, Chelsea Mayor Joel Pressman, and the board of the directors of the Massachusetts chapter of Americans for Democratic Action endorsed Hatch. Lieutenant Governor Thomas P. O'Neill III considered dropping out of the race instead of running on the same ticket as King. However, he chose to stay in the race but express his own ideology.

Results
The King-O'Neill ticket defeated the Hatch-Cowin ticket 53% to 47%.

Results by county

See also
 1977–1978 Massachusetts legislature

References

1978
Gubernatorial
Massachusetts
Massachusetts
Michael Dukakis